Danderyd is situated just north of Stockholm in Sweden
 Danderyd Municipality
 2002 Danderyd municipal election
 Danderyd parish
 Danderyd Ship District
 Danderyds sjukhus - hospital
 Danderyds SK - the ice hockey club